Age Pryor is a New Zealand musician and songwriter. He records and performs solo, he plays many instruments and is a founding member of the Wellington International Ukulele Orchestra, The Woolshed Sessions, and Congress of Animals, and is also a contributing artist to the group Fly My Pretties.

Pryor had his songs played on b.net.

Pryor contributed two songs to the Miramax feature film Eagle Versus Shark. The film was written and directed by Taika Waititi, who also directed the video for the title song off the 'Shanks' Pony' album.

He has also been part of the live band that features on the Flight of the Conchords including the first recording, Folk The World Tour, in 2002.

Discography

Solo albums
homerecordings - Age Pryor & Tessa Rain, 2001, own label (CD)
City Chorus - Age Pryor, 2003, own label (CD)
Shanks' Pony - Age Pryor, 2007, own label (CD)
Invisible Lines - Age Pryor, 2021, own label (CD)

Ensemble Albums
Fly My Pretties: Live At Bats - Fly My Pretties, Loop, 2004
Fly My Pretties: The Return - Fly My Pretties, Loop, 2005
Fly My Pretties: IV - Fly My Pretties, Loop, 2012
The Woolshed Sessions - The Woolshed Sessions, 2008, own label
The Heartache EP - The Wellington International Ukulele Orchestra, 2007, own label (CD)
The Little Bit Wonderful EP - The Wellington International Ukulele Orchestra, 2008, own label (CD)
The Dreaming EP - The Wellington International Ukulele Orchestra, 2009, own label (CD)
I Love You EP - The Wellington International Ukulele Orchestra, 2011, own label (CD)
Be Mine Tonight - The Wellington International Ukulele Orchestra, 2014, own label (CD)
Congress of Animals - Congress of Animals, 2018, own label

External links
Official website

References

Living people
Year of birth missing (living people)
Ukulele players
New Zealand songwriters
Male songwriters
People from Wellington City